Oncino is a comune (municipality) in the Province of Cuneo in the Italian region Piedmont, located about  southwest of Turin and about  northwest of Cuneo.

The municipality of Oncino contains the frazioni (subdivisions, mainly villages and hamlets) Villa, Ruata, Ruera, Serre, Saret, Sant'Ilario, Arlongo, Paschie', Tirolo, Bigorie, Chiotti, and Porcili.

Oncino borders the following municipalities: Casteldelfino, Crissolo, Ostana, Paesana, Pontechianale, and Sampeyre.

Demographic evolution

References

Cities and towns in Piedmont